Hammer the Toff is a 1952 British crime film directed by Maclean Rogers and starring John Bentley and Patricia Dainton.  The film was based on the 1947 novel of the same name by John Creasey, the 17th in the series featuring upper-class sleuth Richard Rollinson, also known as "The Toff".  This film and another Toff adaptation Salute the Toff were shot back-to-back at Nettlefold Studios in the summer of 1951 with identical production credits and many of the same actors.  Hammer the Toff was issued to cinemas in  March 1952 as the sequel to Salute the Toff.  There would be no further entries in the series of films. Although it was once considered lost, appearing on the British Film Institute's "75 Most Wanted" list of missing British feature films, it was released on DVD in March 2016. It was produced by Ernest G. Roy.

Plot
On the train to the seaside resort of Brighthaven, Richard Rollinson (Bentley) is sharing a carriage with an attractive young lady called Susan Lancaster (Dainton).  The journey is rudely interrupted when the window of the carriage is shattered by a barrage of bullets.  Richard learns from the shaken Susan that she is on her way to join an uncle on holiday, and offers to escort her safely to her hotel.  They learn that her uncle has disappeared, but has left Susan a package.  Later, Rollinson happens to overhear a pair of shady characters discussing how to kidnap Susan.  She explains that her uncle has developed a secret formula which sinister characters are keen to get their hands on, and they have been receiving threats of menace, hence the flight to Brighthaven.

Rollinson consults his old colleague Inspector Grice of Scotland Yard, who tells him that the evidence is pointing in the direction of a particular man as being responsible for the abduction.  Using his friends and contacts in the East End, Rollinson investigates, while Susan is being kidnapped and tied up.  Rollinson finally succeeds in identifying the criminals and their leader "The Hammer", releasing Susan and proving that the man suspected by the police is innocent.

Cast
 John Bentley as Richard Rollinson
 Patricia Dainton as Susan Lancaster
 Valentine Dyall as Inspector Grice
 John Robinson as Linnett
 Wally Patch as Bert Ebbutt
 Roddy Hughes as Jolly
 Basil Dignam as Superintendent
 Lockwood West as Kennedy
 Katharine Blake as Janet Lord
 Charles Hawtrey as Cashier
 Ian Fleming as Doctor Lancaster

Reception
Like its predecessor, Hammer the Toff was well received by critics as good quality popular B-movie entertainment.  Kine Weekly described it as "well staged, with a bright line in dialogue, and neat crime angles", while the Daily Film Renter termed it "lively, easily-assimilated strong-arm stuff with a whiff of comedy and a dash of romance".

See also
List of rediscovered films

References

External links
 

1952 crime films
1952 films
British crime films
British black-and-white films
Films based on British novels
Films directed by Maclean Rogers
Films produced by Ernest G. Roy
1950s rediscovered films
Rediscovered British films
1950s English-language films
1950s British films